Mojave 3 were a British rock band consisting of former Slowdive members Neil Halstead (vocals, guitar), Rachel Goswell (vocals, guitar) and Ian McCutcheon (drums) alongside keyboardist Alan Forrester and former Chapterhouse guitarist Simon Rowe.

The band formed as a trio shortly after Slowdive's breakup in 1995, adding Forrester and Rowe after the release of their debut album. Mojave 3 released three albums before going on a hiatus and returning to live performances in 2011, but have been inactive since.

History
The band initially existed as a trio, consisting of Neil Halstead, Rachel Goswell, and McCutcheon. After Slowdive were dropped by Creation Records, the trio decided to change musical direction to a dream pop/country rock/folk music style, and were signed by 4AD Records. They took on the new name "Mojave,"  but upon the discovery of another band already using the name, the "3" was added (in reference to the group's three members). Rowe (formerly of Chapterhouse) and Forrester joined shortly after the release of their first album.

Both Halstead (the main songwriter for the band) and Goswell have released solo albums, also for 4AD. McCutcheon founded and is currently playing with his band called The Loose Salute who are signed to Heavenly Records and Graveface Records.

In 2006, Mojave 3 did a Take-Away Show session with Vincent Moon. Halstead said the band was on hiatus as of 2008, but were planning to release at least one more album in the future.  The band returned to playing live in 2011, including gigs supporting Band of Horses
. During a radio interview on Israeli radio station Kol HaCampus on 7 May 2011, Halstead said the band were working on new material, and may be recording during the summer; however, nothing materialized.

Discography

Albums
Ask Me Tomorrow (16 October 1995) CAD 5013
Out of Tune (5 October 1998) CAD 8018
Excuses for Travellers (15 May 2000) CAD 2K05
Spoon and Rafter (22 September 2003) CAD 2309
Puzzles Like You (19 June 2006) CAD 2604

Singles and EPs
Singles

"Who Do You Love" (29 June 1998) BAD 8011
"Some Kinda Angel" (7 September 1998) BAD 8016
"In Love with a View" (3 April 2000) TAD 2K03
"Any Day Will Be Fine" (1 May 2000) BAD 2K04
"Return to Sender" (11 September 2000) BAD 2K17
"Breaking the Ice" (5 June 2006) BAD 2602
"Puzzles Like You" (6 November 2006) AD 2615

References

External links
Mojave 3 at 4AD
Mojave 3 Gigography
Mojave 3 at musicOMH.com

Mojave 3 at the Internet Archive's live music archive
Review of Puzzles Like You at Subculture Magazine

Musical groups established in 1995
English indie rock groups
Dream pop musical groups
English alternative country groups
4AD artists